Scott McMorrow is an American playwright and actor. McMorrow's plays have been translated into Italian, and they have been produced extensively throughout the United States, including Off-Off Broadway. His award-winning plays and poetry have been widely anthologized, and McMorrow has published multiple books in the field of primary education. He earned a Bachelor of Science in civil engineering from the University of Massachusetts Amherst, and an MFA in creative writing from San Francisco State University.

Awards

Calling Long Distance, Winner, Ivey Awards Play Competition
Leftovers, Winner, Chameleon Theatre Circle’s New Play Contest
Turtle Shopping, Silver Stage Award, New Voice Play Festival
Turtle Shopping, Third Place, Havemeyer Playwright Competition
Fishing the Moon, Semifinalist, Beverly Hills Theatre Guild Julie Harris Competition
Future Sex, Second Place, Jim Highsmith Playwright Competition

See also

References

External links
Scott McMorrow's website

American dramatists and playwrights
Year of birth missing (living people)
Living people